Szysznyk (pronounced SIZ-nik) is an American sitcom produced by Paramount Television. Originally broadcast on CBS as a summer replacement series, five episodes were aired during August 1977, followed by ten more during the 1977-78 television season. The series starred Ned Beatty as Nick Szysznyk.

Plot
Retired Marine Nick Szysznyk is a supervisor at a Washington, D.C. community center.

The ongoing punchline of the show was that people meeting Szysznyk for the first time almost invariably mispronounced his surname.  An example from one episode included a narcotics detective who pronounced his name "Sneeze-wick".

Cast
 Ned Beatty as Nick Szysznyk
 Olivia Cole as Ms. Harrison
 Leonard Barr as Leonard Kriegler
 Thomas Carter as Ray Gun

Guest stars
 Susan Lanier as Sandi Chandler (two episodes)

Episode list

Season 1 (1977)

Season 2 (1977–78)

References

External links
 

1970s American sitcoms
1977 American television series debuts
1978 American television series endings
Television series by CBS Studios
English-language television shows
Television shows set in Washington, D.C.
CBS original programming